Ahmed Essyad (born 1939 in Salé) is a Moroccan composer of classical music.

Born in Salé, he studied at the conservatory of Rabat. He moved to France in 1962, where he continued studies with Max Deutsch. Essyad has composed several operas, including L'eau for Radio France.

Selected works 
 Sultanes, electro-acoustic suite (1973) 
 Identité, cantata (1975)
 Le collier des ruses (1977)
 L'eau, opera (1982)
 Le cycle de l'eau, for flutes and piano
 L'exercice de l'amour, light opera (1995)

Awards 
 Grand Prix national de la musique (1994)

Notes and references 

1939 births
20th-century composers
People from Salé
Living people